Slide Mountain may refer to:
Slide Mountain (Coast Mountains), in British Columbia
Slide Mountain (Montana), a mountain in Beaverhead County, Montana
Slide Mountain (Nevada)
Slide Mountain (Ulster County, New York)
Slide Mountain Lookout

See also
Slide Mountain Ocean, an ancient ocean that existed between the Intermontane Islands and North America in the Triassic 
Slide Mountain Terrane, a late Paleozoic terrane
Slide Mountain Wilderness Area, a tract of state-owned Forest Preserve in New York